Barasat Assembly constituency is an assembly constituency in North 24 Parganas district in the Indian state of West Bengal.

Overview
As per orders of the Delimitation Commission, No. 119 Barasat Assembly constituency is composed of the following: Barasat municipality and Chhota Jagulia gram panchayat of Barasat I community development block,

Barasat Assembly constituency is part of No. 17 Barasat (Lok Sabha constituency).

Members of Legislative Assembly

Election results

2021

2016

2011
In the 2011 election, Chiranjeet of Trinamool Congress defeated his nearest rival Sanjib Chatterjee of Forward Bloc.

.# Swing calculated on Congress+Trinamool Congress vote percentages taken together in 2006.

1977-2006
In the 2006 state assembly elections, Dr. Bithika Mondal of Forward Bloc won the Barasat assembly seat defeating her nearest rival Ashoke Mukherjee of Trinamool Congress. Contests in most years were multi cornered but only winners and runners are being mentioned. Ashoke Mukherjee of Trinamool Congress defeated Saral Deb of Forward Bloc in 2001 and 1996. Saral Deb of Forward Bloc defeated Souren Sen of Congress in 1991, Amar Chandar Deb of Congress in 1987, Ashis Kumar Basu of Congress in 1982, and Kanti Ranjan Chattopadhyay in of Congress in 1977.

1951-1972
Kanti Rangan Chatterjee of Congress won in 1972. Saral Deb of Forward Bloc won in 1971 and 1969. H.K.Basu of Forward Bloc won in 1967. Ashok Krishna Dutt of Congress won in 1962.Chitta Basu of Forward Bloc won in 1957. In independent India's first election in 1951, Amulya Dhan Mukhopadhyay of Congress won the Barasat seat.

References

Assembly constituencies of West Bengal
Politics of North 24 Parganas district